Founded in 1967, Earth Trust is an environmental charity (not-for-profit organisation) which was originally known as the Northmoor Trust for Countryside Conservation. Earth Trust was initially established by the British engineer Sir Martin Wood to promote environmental conservation through land management, education, and land science. It is a registered charity under English law.

Earth Trust is the owner and manager of the largest freely accessible natural green space landscape in Oxfordshire - the iconic Wittenham Clumps: 500 hectares of woodland, farmland, wildflower meadows and wetlands. Earth Trust also care for a growing number of smaller community reserves - special places for both nature and people within urban areas and towns. These places receive 200,000+ visits each year.

As well as managing and promoting accessible natural green spaces for everyone, Earth Trust also operate a working farm. Along with their Farm Step tenants, Earth Trust are one of Oxfordshire's mid-sized producers of legumes, grains and wildflowers, beef, lamb, Goat's cheese and honey.

Earth Trust have 500 hectares of mixed use farmland, demonstrating the links between environment, wildlife, landscape and growing food. Earth Trust encourages and supports the production, distribution and eating of good quality, local, healthy food. Land management, skills and the means needed to produce and distribute food locally, minimising transport and waste are all important ingredients. Earth Trust continue to explore and develop methods to show that farming practices can be environmentally friendly and economically sustainable.

In 2009, Earth Trust came into a management position of Thrupp Lake, located in Radley.

In 2014 Earth Trust started managing Abbey Fishponds in Abingdon. Tucked away in a residential area of the town, Abbey Fishponds is a small nature reserve loved by locals and teeming with wetland wildlife. The reserve is around 7ha and despite being completely enclosed by housing, is a haven for wildlife, walkers and local explorers.

The newest Earth Trust building, Earth Lab is a cutting-edge sustainable building and winner of the “Most Innovative and Sustainable Initiative” at the 2021 OxPropFest awards. More than a building, Earth Lab is a living demonstration of human interactions with the natural environment through its design, materials and functional choices.

The ponds and backwaters were developed in 2021 and provide important habitats for people and wildlife to enjoy as well as wetlands which help to alleviate floods and absorb carbon.

Earth Trust hosts a full programme of events each year, including countryside management courses, taster workshops and family festivals. They are best known for their Lambing Weekends in spring, which were attended by over 8,000 people in 2016.

Properties

Little Wittenham

 Earth Trust Centre – Located at the base of the Wittenham Clumps, the Earth Trust Centre comprises the office, Earth Lab learning centre and Fison Barn, which is hired out for weddings, parties and corporate events.
 Earth Lab - Designed in sympathy with the surrounding landscape, Earth Lab provides a seamless flow from indoor to outdoor learning areas. Used as the learning environment, Earth Lab also provides a range of stimulating and inspirational spaces for corporate events. Earth Lab features a flexible airy atrium space, two indoor classrooms and a covered outdoor meeting space.
 Wittenham Clumps – The two hilltops of Castle Hill and Round Hill are known to be the two oldest planted hilltop beeches in England, dating back over 300 years. Wittenham Clumps and Little Wittenham Nature Reserve are the most visited free site in Oxfordshire.
 Little Wittenham Wood – Located in the area of North Wessex Downs, Little Wittenham Wood is a Site of Special Scientific Interest (SSSI) due to the large breeding population of Great Crested newts that live in the ponds and a Special Area of Conservation (SAC).
 Broad Arboretum – Planted in 1998, the Broad Arboretum features every species of fauna native to Oxfordshire along with recent introductions such as walnut, sycamore and chestnut.
 Neptune Wood – Neptune Wood was planted to honour the 200th anniversary of the Battle of Trafalgar. Thousands of oak trees were planted in this area to replace the countless number of trees that were used to build the ships. Specifically, Lord Nelson's flagship was made out of approximately 5,000 oak trees, while the 27-ship fleet had used over 50,000 trees.
 Paradise Wood – Paradise Wood is a national research woodland that is the largest collection of hardwood timber trials in the country. It consists of around 60,000 hardwood trees and the research is helping Earth Trust champion a new sustainable model for our trees and forests - integrated management which balances their value for amenity and for wildlife, as well as for economic, sustainable timber production.
 River of Life
 River of Life 2

Wallingford

 Wallingford Castle Meadows - Now in ruins, the castle was known to be one of the greatest medieval castles located in England. In 1066, William the Conqueror and his army crossed into the Thames at Wallingford and ordered the building of the castle. Castle Meadows today is home to important wildlife habitats and is a much-loved community greenspace. Earth Trust manage the site on behalf of South Oxfordshire District Council.
 Riverside Meadows - Riverside land located alongside the Thames River in Wallingford. It is considered to be a rare and threatened habitat and Earth Trust is working to restore the wildflower meadows. Riverside Meadows can be enjoyed during the summer months when the meadows are ablaze with fields of oxeye daisy, common knapweed and bird’s-foot trefoil. Earth Trust manage the site on behalf of South Oxfordshire District Council.

Other
 Mowbray Fields - Earth Trust manage this local nature reserve in Didcot on behalf of South Oxfordshire District Council. It is home to the common spotted and southern marsh orchids.
 Thrupp Lake - Thrupp Lake, part of the Radley Lake complex, is located in the village of Radley on the edge of Abingdon and is a man-made lake owned by RWE npower and managed by Earth Trust. Radley Lakes were the subject of a community campaign to save them from being filled in (2005-8). In 2015 Earth Trust was awarded the management contract for some of the surrounding former lakes.
 Abbey Fishponds - Earth Trust took over the management of this community nature reserve in Abingdon in July 2014.The site is also known as Daisy Bank. Earth Trust manage the site on behalf of Vale of White Horse District Council. The reserve is around 7ha and despite being completely enclosed by housing, is a haven for wildlife, walkers and local explorers.

Earth Trust events 
Earth Trust host many events throughout the year that aim to get people out enjoying the countryside, from family festivals to bushcraft courses. The majority are held at their flagship site in Little Wittenham with a small number taking place on the nearby community nature reserves that the charity manages. Such events such as the 'Lambing Weekends' happen yearly.

One such notable previous event was the Children's Food Festival, held in 2007 and in 2009 in Oxfordshire. It was fronted by patrons Raymond Blanc and Sophie Grigson, who gave hands-on demos, inviting children to help them chop, stir, smell and taste. Other guests have included Annabel Karmel, Jane Fearnley-Whittingstall (author of The Good Granny Cookbook), Sam Stern (the Teenage Chef), Nora Sands (Jamie's School Dinner Lady) and children's cookery writer Amanda Grant.

The idea for a food festival for children came to Eka Morgan, the Festival's Director, in 2005. "Parents say that one of the best ways to encourage children to eat good food is to get them to cook it themselves. I thought that a festival which conveyed positive messages about food, with plenty of colour, humour and hands-on cooking, could go some way to transform young people’s approach to eating."

See also 
 The Poem Tree at Wittenham Clumps, carved by Joseph Tubb.

References

External links 
 Earth Trust website

Environmental organisations based in England
Education in Oxfordshire
Environment of Oxfordshire
Charities based in Oxfordshire